Khalifeh Bolaghi (also Romanized as Khalīfeh Bolāghī; also known as Khalīt Bolāgh) is a village in Hendudur Rural District, Sarband District, Shazand County, Markazi Province, Iran. At the 2006 census, its population was 281, in 59 families.

References 

Populated places in Shazand County